The Breaking Point starred many Hong Kong stars like Kathy Chow, Maggie Shiu, Deric Wan and Leon Lai. The highly acclaim worthy appraisal movie-length episode was dubbed into many other languages, and critically has influence in many cultures, specifically in Asia.

1990s Chinese television series